Miss Universe 1974 was the 23rd Miss Universe pageant, held on 21 July 1974 at the Folk Arts Theater in the City of Manila, Philippines. It was the first Miss Universe pageant to ever be held in the Philippines, and in extension, Asia. Margie Moran of the Philippines crowned her successor Amparo Muñoz of Spain at the end of the event, marking the first and so far only time Spain has ever won a Miss Universe competition.

There were 65 delegates from around the world who competed for the 1974 title.
6 months later, Amparo Muñoz decided to relinquish her title due to homesickness, Helen Morgan, the first runner up, didin't accept the title of Miss Universe 1974, because she went on to win Miss World 1974, then resigned 4 days later. No runner up wasn't accepted to take over the title, it remained vacant until the 1975 Miss Universe Pageant.

Results

Placements

Order Of Announcements

Top 12

Top 5

Contestants

Notes

Debuts

Returns
 Last competed in 1970:
 
 Last competed in 1972:

Withdrawals

Name Change
  began competing as Sri Lanka after the country became a republic.

Awards
  - Miss Amity (Anna Bjornsdóttir)
  - Miss Photogenic (Johanna Raunio)
  - Best National Costume (Kim Jae-kyu)

General References

References

External links
 Miss Universe official website

1974
1974 in the Philippines
1974 beauty pageants
Beauty pageants in the Philippines
Events in Manila
July 1974 events in Asia